David R. Millard (born February 10, 1953) is a US Republican member of the Pennsylvania House of Representatives for the 109th legislative district. He was elected in a special election on January 27, 2004 to fill the unexpired term of John Gordner, who was elected to the Pennsylvania Senate.

Biography
Millard attended Bloomsburg High School, graduating in 1971. Millard's mother suffered a series of strokes before he was born. When he was 15, she died.  Afterward, Millard's father worked multiple jobs to support David and his five elder siblings. After taking classes at night, Millard earned a degree in office administration from Bloomsburg University in 1988. Millard's second wife, Emily, died in 1996 after a three-month bout with cancer. He married his third wife, Rita, in 1999. The Millards own and operate a real estate rental business and a fabric store in Bloomsburg, Pennsylvania.

Prior to elective office, Millard worked for Bechtel Power Corporation from 1974 to 1984. He then worked for PPL until his election in 2004. As an employee of PPL, he joined and served in the leadership of the local chapter of the International Brotherhood of Electrical Workers. He also served as director of the Bloomsburg Fair and vice-president of the Bloomsburg Volunteer Fire Department.

In December 2021, Millard announced he would not seek re-election in 2022 and would also be retiring from his director position on the Bloomsburg Fair Board.

Millard currently sits on the Judiciary and Tourism & Recreational Development as Chair.

References

External links

Representative Millard's official web site
Pennsylvania House profile
Citizens for Dan Knorr website the opponent to Millard in the 2012 election.

Bloomsburg University of Pennsylvania alumni
Living people
Republican Party members of the Pennsylvania House of Representatives
1953 births
21st-century American politicians
People from Bloomsburg, Pennsylvania